Incarnate is the seventh studio album by American metalcore band Killswitch Engage, released on March 11, 2016. The band released "Strength of the Mind" as a promotional single from the album on December 11, 2015 and revealed the title of the album six days later. The band toured to promote the album with Memphis May Fire and 36 Crazyfists. On January 26, 2016, the track listing was revealed. Three singles were released from the album: "Strength of the Mind" on December 11 (with an accompanying video), "Hate by Design" on January 29 (with an accompanying video) and "Cut Me Loose" on February 19. The album debuted at No. 6 on the Billboard 200, making it the band's most successful album on the chart, and reached No. 1 on both the Top Rock Albums and Hard Rock Albums charts, with 33,000 copies sold on its first week of release.

Writing and recording 
Writing this album proved to be lengthy and troublesome, Adam Dutkiewicz commenting that lead singer Jesse Leach had "hit a wall with ideas" during the songwriting process after completing three or four tracks on the album, adding that "[Jesse] couldn't find lyrics he was really stoked on". Leach himself has stated that he "came to a point where this album literally drove me crazy", in that "there were a good couple of weeks where I wasn't myself. I just got lost in the process, because I wanted this record to be everything it could be. I was losing sleep, not sleeping at all, and waking up in the middle of the night and sitting down and writing pages and pages and pages of words. By the time all was said and done, I probably had 80 pages of lyrics. I just wanted to give it everything I could, vocally and lyrically."

Leach spoke at length on the lyrical themes that comprise the album, telling Blabbermouth that "I wanted to be able to speak on current events — stuff that is relevant to us today, stuff that's in the headlines — but I wanted to do it in such a way where it's ambiguous enough where people can sort of draw their own conclusion. I just wanted to strike people to think. So that's one aspect of it. And the other aspect of it is speaking about my truths, like what I think. And I'd sort of separated myself from all that stuff — social media and the news and all the violence and racism that's going on in our media these days; I just couldn't deal with it. So in order for me to make a valid point that said something, I had to submerge myself into that stuff and really start paying attention to what's going on. And songs like 'Hate By Design', 'Alone I Stand', 'The Great Deceit' came out of those processes in writing. And the other side of it was the spiritual realm, the soul-searching stuff. I really had to re-evaluate myself, as far as where I am in my own mind, so I had to seclude myself. So it was a balance between submerging myself in all the terrible things that are going on and then distancing myself and finding solace and really doing some soul searching on my own, and both of those things happened while writing this record."

Album title and cover art 
Leach, upon being questioned about the meaning of the album's title and cover artwork, stated "[The title] wasn't a catalyst for the record. It actually came when we were about three quarters of the way done with the record. Our bass player Mike [D'Antonio], who does all of our artwork and designing and t-shirts and everything, came up with the title out of nowhere. I'd actually sent him an idea I had for the album cover, which… I came out of a nightmare and had a dream of a man being pulled apart by two snakes and two cranes, and his insides kind of, like, coming out, which is pretty graphic and not really our style for KILLSWITCH, but it was the image that we used and had transformed by another artist. And then he said he was looking at it and the word 'incarnate' just came to him. And I thought, 'What a great word!' It just sounds good, it's ambiguous enough where people can draw their own conclusion, and the definition of it is 'in the flesh,' which is almost like an ambiguous definition. So it just sort of causes thought, and I love that about it. I love that it just sounds epic and causes conversation."

Critical reception 

Critical reception for Incarnate was generally positive upon release. Aggregate review website Metacritic has assigned the album an overall score of 78 out of 100, based on reviews from five professional critics as of March 11, 2016.

Thom Jurek from AllMusic awarded the album a score of 3.5/5, stating that "as a whole, Incarnate improves on the creativity and restlessness offered by Disarm the Descent. There is a lot more ambition, confidence and above all, passion here.

Alec Chillingworth of Stereoboard.com was slightly more critical of the album, stated that "Incarnate is not the best Killswitch Engage album. It's not as immediate as you're used to and it does suffer when held up against Alive or Just Breathing, Disarm the Descent or even The End of Heartache. It does occasionally take risks, and they do pay off, but otherwise it plods along at a pedestrian pace, only to be redeemed in part by Leach's vocal versatility." Chillingworth did, however, praise lead vocalist Jesse Leach's vocal delivery throughout the album, by stating that he thought "Leach's vocals, at least, are never short of incredible and 'Incarnate' is arguably his strongest and most diverse outing with the band. His cleans are more controlled, his screams even dirtier than before and the chant of 'the screams, the cries!' on Quiet Distress finds him sounding a bit like Prong's Tommy Victor."

Track listing

Personnel 
Credits adapted from album's liner notes.
Killswitch Engage
Jesse Leach – lead vocals
Adam Dutkiewicz – lead guitar, backing vocals
Joel Stroetzel – rhythm guitar, backing vocals
Mike D'Antonio – bass guitar
Justin Foley – drums

Technical personnel
Trash D – producer, engineer, mixing
Daniel Castleman – engineer
Steve the Dog – assistant engineer
Ted Jensen – mastering
Indra Nugroho – album illustrations
Travis Shinn – group photos
Mike D – art direction and layout
Vaughn Lewis – management
Kenny Gabor – management
Dave Rath – A&R
Mark Scribner – business manager
Nicholas C. Ferrara – legal representation
Tim Borror – U.S. Booking
Paul Ryan – International Booking

Charts

Weekly charts

Year-end charts

References 

Killswitch Engage albums
2016 albums
Albums produced by Adam Dutkiewicz
Roadrunner Records albums